Sweets from a Stranger is the fifth studio album by the British new wave group Squeeze, released in September 1982 through A&M. The album peaked at number 20 in the UK Albums Chart. The band split up soon after a world tour for the record, and the two main songwriters went on to record 1984's Difford & Tilbrook. Squeeze reunited and released Cosi Fan Tutti Frutti in 1985. As with all Squeeze albums, Chris Difford wrote the words first and Glenn Tilbrook would write the music afterwards often editing Difford's material to create a streamlined narrative. Tilbrook would record a demo afterwards and play it for Difford.

Background and recording 

Paul Carrack had left the band to work on his solo career and work as a studio musician. He was replaced by Don Snow. Snow would later appear with Procol Harum and Tina Turner on their respective albums and tours. Snow would later change his name to Jonn Savannah.

Within a year after the release of this album, Squeeze broke up. Difford and Tilbrook carried on releasing an album under both of their names before reforming Squeeze with the band's original drummer Gilson Lavis and keyboardist Jools Holland. Keith Wilkinson who had toured with Difford and Tilbrook replaced John Bentley for the reunion album "Cosi Fan Tutti Frutti".

In 1997, the CD was released in the UK with two bonus tracks, as part of the Six of One... box set. The set included the band's first six studio albums, each digitally remastered. These CDs were made available for individual purchase in 1998.

A 2008 reissue included the two 1997 bonus tracks, and added a further seven tracks.

Music 
Detailing the stylistic direction of Sweets from a Stranger, Stephen Thomas Erlewine opined that Squeeze "wound up largely ditching the pop classicism of East Side Story for a gangly new wave experimentalism". "I've Returned" has been likened to Bruce Springsteen in sound, while Erlewine detailed "Onto the Dance Floor" to be "wannabe Bowie".

Reception

Critical reception 

AllMusic's Stephen Thomas Erlewine gave a mixed and predominantly critical summary of Sweets from a Stranger. Despite noting "connections" to the band's acclaimed East Side Story and speaking positively of songs including "I've Returned" and the "sublime" peak "Black Coffee in Bed", Erlewine wrote-off much of the effort as "new wave clatter".

Artist's reflection 
In retrospect both composers were critical of the album stating feeling that the songwriting and the production weren't up to par compared to what they did before. The American edition of the album featured praise for Difford and Tilbrook songs which both felt created additional pressure to create a classic with every single song. Difford commented "You just write to please yourself first of all...if other people like it, that's a bonus."

Track listing
All songs written by Chris Difford and Glenn Tilbrook.
 "Out of Touch" – 3:50
 "I Can't Hold On" – 3:34
 "Points of View" – 4:12
 "Stranger Than the Stranger on the Shore" – 3:19
 "Onto the Dance Floor" – 3:37
 "When the Hangover Strikes" – 4:29
 "Black Coffee in Bed" – 6:12
 "I've Returned" – 2:34
 "Tongue Like a Knife" – 4:10
 "His House Her Home" – 3:23
 "The Very First Dance" – 3:17
 "The Elephant Ride" – 3:22

Bonus tracks (1997 & 2008 reissues)
"I Can't Get Up Anymore" – 3:55
 "When Love Goes to Sleep" – 3:44

Bonus tracks (2008 reissue only)
 "Annie Get Your Gun" – 3:25
 "I'm At Home Tonight" – 3:23
 "Elephant Girl" – 3:38
 "Spanish Guitar" – 2:46
 "Tomorrow's World (His House Her Home)" (Glenn Tilbrook Demo) – 3:09
 "Whenever We Meet" (Demo Version) – 2:58
 "Last Call For Love" – 3:28

Personnel 
Squeeze
 Chris Difford – rhythm guitars, backing vocals, lead vocals on "His House Her Home"
 Glenn Tilbrook – lead guitars, keyboards, lead and backing vocals
 Don Snow – keyboards, backing vocals
 John Bentley – bass guitar, backing vocals
 Gilson Lavis – drums

Additional personnel
 Del Newman – string arrangements
 Elvis Costello – backing vocals on "Black Coffee in Bed"
 Paul Young – backing vocals on "Black Coffee in Bed"

Production
 Squeeze – producers, cover design 
 Phil McDonald – producer, engineer 
 Butch Yates – assistant engineer 
 Frank DeLuna – mastering at A&M Mastering Studios (Hollywood, California, US)
 Simon Ryan – cover design
 Michael Putland – cover photography

References

External links
 Album summary

1982 albums
Squeeze (band) albums
A&M Records albums